Bilbolbul is an Italian comic strip series created by  Attilio Mussino.

Background 
The comic feature Bilbolbul was published in the children's magazine Il Corriere dei Piccoli from 1908 to 1933. It is commonly considered Italy's first comic. Its main character, Bilbolbul, is an African kid who interprets everything literally—including the most common metaphors and expressions—with bizarre and surreal effects.

References 

Italian comic strips
Italian comics characters
1908 comics debuts
1933 comics endings
Gag-a-day comics
Text comics
Fictional African people
Black people in comics
Child characters in comics
Male characters in comics
Comics characters introduced in 1908